"Soulshine" is a song written by American musician Warren Haynes and originally recorded by Larry McCray on his 1993 album, Delta Hurricane. It is best known as a recording that The Allman Brothers Band released on their 1994 album, Where It All Begins, featuring Gregg Allman on vocals. The song's title originates from Haynes's nickname, given by his father.

Although the Allman's version was never released as a single, it remained one of their best known songs among fans and concert-goers. A live version of the song, which appeared on the Allmans' 2003 DVD, Live at the Beacon Theatre, had Allman and Haynes alternating vocals on the verses and harmonizing on the chorus, and includes a slide solo from Derek Trucks, as Dickey Betts was no longer with the band. This has become the standard for the song in most recent years with dual vocals.

When Haynes and bassist Allen Woody formed Gov't Mule, they took the song with them. Gov't Mule performs "Soulshine" live at their concerts and it was included on the band's Live... With a Little Help from Our Friends, The Deep End, Volume 1, and The Deepest End, Live in Concert releases.

Cover versions
Beth Hart covered this song on her 2007 album, 37 Days.

The song was covered by two contestants from the thirteenth season of American Idol. C.J. Harris used the song during his audition (and also in the Top 8) and Ben Briley performed the song during "Rush Week".

The 1997 David Allan Coe album Live: If That Ain't Country... has a cover of this song as the second track, since Haynes, Coe's original guitar player, joined him for that concert.

References

External links
 Video of the song

The Allman Brothers Band songs
1994 songs
Song recordings produced by Tom Dowd